Ilaló is a volcano (eroded and no longer active) between San Pedro River to the west and Chiche River to the east, in Quito Canton, Pichincha Province, Ecuador. Ilaló is surrounded by the rural parishes Cumbayá, Tumbaco, La Merced and Alangasí.

A song was dedicated to the ex volcano by Chancha Via Circuito titled "Ilaló"

Hills of Ecuador
Quito Canton
Volcanoes of Ecuador
Geography of Pichincha Province